Eurysops burgeoni is a species of beetle in the family Cerambycidae. It was described by Stephan von Breuning in 1935. It feeds on Morus alba.

Subspecies
 Eurysops burgeoni burgeoni Breuning, 1935
 Eurysops burgeoni dudleyi Sudre & Téocchi, 2002

References

Phrynetini
Beetles described in 1935